River Edge is a New Jersey Transit rail station on the Pascack Valley Line. The station is one of two rail stations in River Edge, New Jersey and is located at River Edge Road and Park Avenue, one block east of Kinderkamack Road (County Route 503) and three blocks west of River Road.

History
The original station caught fire on February 8, 1901, from a spark from a passing train. The station was rebuilt and reopened on September 22, 1902. The station was named by a committee of donors that helped to fund the building of the new station and voted to name it River Edge station.

Station layout
The station has one track and one low-level side platform, and has a heated waiting area for passengers. Permit parking is operated by the Borough of River Edge. For New Milford residents, there is a commuter lot provided by the Borough located nearly two blocks away in New Milford.

In popular culture
The station can be seen in a scene of the 2008 movie Be Kind Rewind.

References

External links

Borough of River Edge
 Station and Station House from River Edge Road from Google Maps Street View

NJ Transit Rail Operations stations
Railway stations in the United States opened in 1870
River Edge, New Jersey
Former Erie Railroad stations
Railway stations in Bergen County, New Jersey
1870 establishments in New Jersey